Symphony No. 17 in G major, K. 129, is the second of three symphonies completed by Wolfgang Amadeus Mozart in May 1772, when he was 16 years old, but some of its sections may have been written earlier.

Structure
Mozart wrote the symphony in three movements and is scored for two oboes, two horns, and strings.

Allegro, 
Andante, 
Allegro, 

The first movement is notable for its use of the Mannheim crescendo, while the second movement features a solo violin.

References

External links

17
1772 compositions
Compositions in G major